Mohan Mandavi is an Indian politician. He was elected to the Lok Sabha, lower house of the Parliament of India from Kanker, Chhattisgarh in the 2019 Indian general election as member of the Bharatiya Janata Party.

References

External links
 Official biographical sketch in Parliament of India website

India MPs 2019–present
Lok Sabha members from Chhattisgarh
Living people
Bharatiya Janata Party politicians from Chhattisgarh
1957 births